"Honey Bucket" is a single from American sludge metal band Melvins released on September 21, 1993. It is taken from their major label debut (and their fifth studio album) Houdini. It is the fifth track off the album.

Personnel
Buzz Osborne (King Buzzo) - vocals, guitar
Dale Crover - drums, bass

Cover versions

The Dillinger Escape Plan version

This song was covered by American mathcore band the Dillinger Escape Plan on August 23, 2005. The Dillinger Escape Plan's version  is featured on the tribute album/compilation album We Reach: The Music of the Melvins.

Personnel
 Greg Puciato - lead vocals
 James Love - rhythm guitar
 Ben Weinman - lead guitar
 Liam Wilson - bass guitar
 Chris Pennie - drums

Burn the Priest version

This song was covered by American metal band Lamb of God, under their original name Burn the Priest, released on May 18, 2018 on their cover album Legion: XX. Coincidentally, The Dillinger Escape Plan lead singer Greg Puciato performed guest vocals in the song "Torches", from the previous Lamb of God album VII: Sturm und Drang.

Personnel
 Randy Blythe - lead vocals
 Mark Morton - lead guitar
 Willie Adler - rhythm guitar
 John Campbell - bass guitar
 Chris Adler - drums

References

Melvins songs
1993 songs
1993 singles
Atlantic Records singles